Las Vegas Municipal Airport  is five miles (8 km) northeast of Las Vegas, in San Miguel County, New Mexico.

The airport was a stop on the first air route between Denver and El Paso that began in 1929. Mid-Continental Air Express first flew the route with stops at Colorado Springs, Pueblo, Las Vegas, Santa Fe, and Albuquerque.  Western Air Express acquired the route by 1931, replaced by Varney Speed Lines Lockheed Vegas in 1934. In 1937 Continental Airlines flew Lockheed Model 10 Electras followed by Lockheed Lodestars.

Service was interrupted in the late 1930s but Continental returned with Douglas DC-3s and stops were added at Trinidad, Colorado and at Raton, Socorro, Truth or Consequences, and Las Cruces, New Mexico.  Continental pulled out in 1952 due to airport conditions. Pioneer Airlines DC-3s served Las Vegas from 1948 to 1952 on a route between Albuquerque and Dallas via Santa Fe, Las Vegas, Tucumcari, Clovis, Lubbock, Abilene, Mineral Wells, and Ft. Worth.

Two commuter airlines briefly served Las Vegas: Trans Central Airlines in 1969/1970 with flights to Albuquerque and Denver on a route similar to that of Continental, and Territorial Airlines in 1990 with flights to Albuquerque and Raton, NM. The airport currently receives air cargo service by South Aero with flights to Albuquerque on behalf of UPS.

Facilities

In the year ending April 11, 2006 the airport had 11,350 aircraft operations, average 31 per day: 97% general aviation and 3% military. 14 aircraft were then based at this airport: 86% single-engine, 7% multi-engine and 7% jet.

In film 

The airport appeared in the 2011 film Haywire.

References

External links 
 Las Vegas Municipal Airport at City of Las Vegas web site
 The First Las Vegas at SW Aviator Magazine

Airports in New Mexico
Buildings and structures in San Miguel County, New Mexico
Transportation in San Miguel County, New Mexico